Lou Cella is an American sculptor. His works include Seattle's statues of Dave Niehaus (2011), Ken Griffey Jr. (2017), Don James (2017), and Edgar Martínez (2021). In 2018, he received the United States Sports Academy's Sport Artist of the Year Award for sculpture.

References

Living people
American sculptors
Year of birth missing (living people)